= Embry-Riddle Aeronautical University Asia =

Private university in Singapore

Coordinates: 1.30702°N 103.84772°E

- Motto: "Expanding a tradition of excellence."
- Established: 2011
- Parent institution: Embry-Riddle Aeronautical University
- Vice-Chancellor: Matthew Flaherty
- Students: approximately 400 (as of 2015)
- Location: 70 Seletar Aerospace View, Singapore
- Website: asia.erau.edu

ERAU Asia is a private university in Singapore, and is a branch of Embry-Riddle Aeronautical University, based in the United States.

Embry-Riddle Asia's main office building is located at 75 Bukit Timah Road, while classes are offered at ERC Institute at 229 Mountbatten Road, #01-30, Mountbatten Square, Singapore 398007.

== Programs offered ==
Currently, ERAU Asia offers undergraduate degree, graduate degree, and online degree programs. These can be done either in a full-time delivery or a part-time delivery. Most students are enrolled into the undergraduate degree programs; Bachelor of Science in Aeronautics and Bachelor of Science in Aviation Business Administration. ERAU Asia is fully owned by Embry-Riddle Aeronautical University and all courses are provided by the university. Embry-Riddle Asia provides the same American style education they offer in the United States in Singapore. Most of the faculty are brought in from the United States to teach in Singapore.
